Mayo-Tatchun is an electoral district which returns an MLA to the Legislative Assembly of the Yukon Territory in Canada. It is an amalgamation of the former Mayo and Tatchun electoral districts.

Mayo-Tatchun is currently one of the Yukon's eight rural ridings. It includes the communities of Carmacks, Pelly Crossing, Mayo, Stewart Crossing, and Keno City. The riding includes the traditional territory of the Selkirk First Nation, the First Nation of Na-Cho Nyäk Dun, and the Little Salmon/Carmacks First Nation. It is bordered by the ridings of Vuntut Gwitchin, Klondike, Lake Laberge, Kluane, and Pelly-Nisutlin.

Members of the Legislative Assembly

Electoral results

2021 general election

2016 general election

|-

| Liberal
| Don Hutton
| align="right"| 331
| align="right"| 45.3%
| align="right"| +18.6%
|-

| NDP
| Jim Tredger
| align="right"| 233
| align="right"| 31.9%
| align="right"| -9.8%

|-
! align left colspan=3|Total
! align=right| 730
! align=right| 100.0%
! align=right| –
|}

2011 general election

|-

| NDP
| Jim Tredger
| align="right"| 282
| align="right"| 41.7%
| align="right"| +24.2%

| Liberal
| Eric Fairclough
| align="right"| 181
| align="right"| 26.7%
| align="right"| -26.5%
|-
! align left colspan=3|Total
! align=right| 677
! align=right| 100.0%
! align=right| –
|}

2006 general election

|-

| Liberal
| Eric Fairclough
| align="right"|301
| align="right"|53.2%
| align="right"| +22.6%

| NDP
| Karen Gage
| align="right"|99
| align="right"|17.5%
| align="right"|-21.9%
|-
! align=left colspan=3|Total
! align=right|566
! align=right|100.0%
! align=right| –
|}

2002 general election

|-

| NDP
| Eric Fairclough
| align="right"|339
| align="right"|49.3%
| align="right"|-12.4%
|-

| Liberal
| Pat Van Bibber
| align="right"|210
| align="right"|30.6%
| align="right"|-7.7%
|-

|-

| Independent
| Dibs Williams
| align="right"|36
| align="right"|5.2%
| align="right"|+5.2%

|-
! align=left colspan=3|Total
! align=right|687
! align=right|100.0%
! align=right| –
|}

2000 general election

|-

| NDP
| Eric Fairclough
| align="right"|446
| align="right"|61.7%
| align="right"|-9.9%

| Liberal
| Wilf Tuck
| align="right"|277
| align="right"|38.3%
| align="right"|+38.3%
|-
! align=left colspan=3|Total
! align=right|723
! align=right|100.0%
! align=right| –
|}

1996 general election

|-

| NDP
| Eric Fairclough
| align="right"|454
| align="right"|71.6%
| align="right"|+26.6%

|-
! align=left colspan=3|Total
! align=right|634
! align=right|100.0%
! align=right| –
|}

1992 general election

|-

| NDP
| Danny Joe
| align="right"| 297
| align="right"| 45.0%
| align="right"|–
|-

| Liberal
| Roddy Blackjack
| align="right"| 99
| align="right"| 15.0%
| align="right"| –
|-

|-
! align=left colspan=3|Total
! align=right| 660
! align=right| 100.0%
! align=right| –
|}

References 

 Mayo-Tatchun - Yukon Votes 2006. Retrieved May 22, 2009.

 - Maps and Descriptions of Electoral Districts (Final Report), 2008. Retrieved January 18, 2017.

 - Don Hutton, Yukon Legislative Assembly. Retrieved January 18, 2017.

Yukon territorial electoral districts